The Munster Senior League was a Rugby union competition for senior clubs in Munster.

History 

It was first competed for in 1902–03.

Format 

Unlike the Munster Senior Cup which is knock-out, the league format means that teams play a number of different games, with the most successful qualifying for the play-offs.

Decline 

With the establishment of the All-Ireland League in 1991 the competition declined rapidly, and no longer was contested with the same intensity as previously existed.

List of champions 

 1902-03 Garryowen
 1903-04 Garryowen
 1904-05 Garryowen
 1905-06 Garryowen
 1906-07 Garryowen
 1907-08 Garryowen
 1908-09 Garryowen
 1909-10 Garryowen
 1910-11 Garryowen/Cork Constitution
 1911-12 Garryowen/Cork Constitution
 1912-13 UCC
 1913-14 UCC/Cork Constitution
 1914-21 no competition
 1921-22 Cork Constitution
 1922-23 Cork Constitution
 1923-24 Dolphin
 1924-25 Garryowen
 1925-26 Dolphin
 1927 Cork Constitution
 1928 Sundays Well
 1929 Dolphin
 1930 Young Munster
 1931 Bohemians/UCC
 1932 Young Munster
 1933 UCC
 1934 UCC
 1935 Sundays Well
 1936 Garryowen/UCC
 1936-37 unfinished
 1937-38 unfinished
 1938-39 Cork Constitution
 1939-40 unfinished
 1940-41 unfinished
 1941-42 UCC
 1943 UCC
 1944 Young Munster
 1945 UCC ? beat Cork Constitution
 1946 Garryowen
 1947 Garryowen ? beat Dolphin
 1948 Sundays Well beat Garryowen
 1949 Dolphin
 1950 UCC beat Cork Constitution
 1951 Sundays Well beat Young Munster
 1952 Young Munster beat Dolphin
 1953 Cork Constitution beat Bohemians
 1954 Garryowen
 1955 Dolphin beat UCC
 1956 Dolphin
 1957 Cork Constitution beat UCC
 1959 Bohemians beat UCC
 1960 Sundays Well 
 1961 UCC beat Dolphin
 1962 UCC beat Bohemians
 1963 UCC beat Highfield
 1964 Cork Constitution beat Shannon
 1965 Cork Constitution beat UCC
 1966 Cork Constitution beat UCC
 1967 Cork Constitution
 1968 Cork Constitution
 1969 Cork Constitution
 1970 Cork Constitution beat Garryowen
 1971 Cork Constitution beat Garryowen
 1972 Cork Constitution beat Garryowen
 1973 Dolphin beat Cork Constitution
 1974 UCC beat Highfield
 1975 Cork Constitution beat Garryowen
 1976 Cork Constitution beat Dolphin
 1977 Cork Constitution beat Bohemians
 1978 UCC beat Garryowen
 1979 Cork Constitution beat Dolphin
 1980 Shannon beat Young Munster
 1981 UCC beat Young Munster
 1982 Garryowen beat UCC
 1983 Garryowen beat Shannon
 1984 Cork Constitution beat Highfield
 1985 UCC beat Cork Constitution
 1986 Shannon beat Cork Constitution
 1987 Cork Constitution beat Young Munster
 1988 Cork Constitution beat Shannon
 1989 Shannon beat Cork Constitution
 1990 Highfield beat Sundays Well
 1991 Dolphin beat Highfield
 1992 Old Crescent beat UCC
 1993 Sundays Well beat Highfield
 1994 
 1995
 1996 Young Munster
 1997 Old Crescent
 1998 Cork Constitution
 1998-99 Old Crescent/Sundays Well
 1999-2000 Old Crescent/Sundays Well
 2000-01 Garryowen beat Thomond
 2001-02 Shannon beat Garryowen
 2002-03 Shannon beat Garryowen
 2003-04 Cork Constitution beat Garryowen
 2004-05 Shannon beat UL Bohemians
 2005-06

See also
 Connacht Senior League
 Leinster Senior League
 Ulster Senior League

References

 The Carling Story of Munster Rugby by Charlie Mulqueen

3
Rugby union competitions in Munster
Irish senior rugby competitions